Huntsville is an unincorporated community in Columbia County, in the U.S. state of Washington.

History
A post office called Huntsville was established in 1880, and remained in operation until 1968. The community was named for B. J. Hunt, an original owner of the town site.

References

Unincorporated communities in Columbia County, Washington
Unincorporated communities in Washington (state)